Qohab may refer to:
 Qohab, Zanjan
 Qohab-e Rastaq Rural District, in Semnan Province
 Qohab-e Sarsar Rural District, in Semnan Province

See also
 Qahab